Wasylkiw is a surname. Notable people with the surname include: 

 Katelyn Wasylkiw (born 1993), Canadian curler
 Lauren Wasylkiw (born 1990), Canadian curler

See also
 Mark Wasyliw, Canadian politician